Adela Yarbro Collins (born 1945) is an American author and academic, who has served as the Buckingham Professor of New Testament Criticism and Interpretation at Yale Divinity School. Her research focuses on the New Testament, especially the Gospel of Mark and the Book of Revelation, and she has also written on early Christian apocalypticism and eschatology. Collins has also served as the President of the Society of New Testament Studies (2010–2011) and as the President of the New England Region of the Society of Biblical Literature (2004–2005).

Biography
Born in 1945 as Adela Yarbro, she received a Bachelor of Arts degree from Pomona College, and her Master and Ph.D. degrees from Harvard University. In addition to her current position at Yale, Collins also held appointments at the University of Notre Dame from 1985–91 and at the University of Chicago from 1991–2000.

In 2010, a Festschrift was published in her honor: Women and Gender in Ancient Religions.

Personal life
Adela Yarbro met and married John J. Collins, who has served as the Holmes Professor of Old Testament Criticism and Interpretation also at Yale Divinity School since 2000. The two co-authored King and Messiah as Son of God (Grand Rapids: Eerdmans, 2008).

Adela Yarbro Collins is now an international author on Biblical Theology.

Select works

Thesis

Books

Edited by

Festschrift

References

External links
 
 

American biblical scholars
Roman Catholic biblical scholars
New Testament scholars
Yale Divinity School faculty
Living people
Pomona College alumni
Harvard University alumni
University of Notre Dame faculty
University of Chicago faculty
1945 births
Female biblical scholars
Fellows of the American Academy of Arts and Sciences